John Wesley Williams (December 3, 1904 – death unknown), nicknamed "Big Boy", was an American Negro league baseball player, primarily a pitcher, between 1926 and 1936.

A native of South Bend, Indiana, Williams made his Negro leagues debut in 1926 with the Dayton Marcos. He spent 1927 through 1930 with the St. Louis Stars, and was credited with a win and a loss in 12 innings pitched in the Stars' 1928 Negro National League championship series victory over the Chicago American Giants. He also played in the outfield when not pitching.

References

External links
 and Seamheads

1904 births
Year of death missing
Place of death missing
Dayton Marcos players
St. Louis Stars (baseball) players
Baseball pitchers
Baseball players from South Bend, Indiana